Fredrik William Ball (born 5 June 1977) is a Norwegian record producer, songwriter and record executive living in London. He is originally from Fredrikstad in Norway.

His production and writing credits include songs performed by Rihanna, Beyonce, Jay-Z, Eminem, Alicia Keys, Mariah Carey, Zara Larsson, Jessie Reyez, Little Mix, Raye, Jessie Ware, Anne-Marie, Toni Braxton, Bernhoft and more. He's been nominated five times for a Grammy (Best R&B Album 2015, Best Urban Contemporary Album 2017, Best R&B Album 2019, Best Urban Contemporary Album 2019, Best Urban Contemporary Album 2020)

Fred moved to the UK when he formed his solo project 'Pleasure'; the album was hailed as The Sunday Times favourite debut of the year. It featured artists such as Justine Frischmann, Ed Harcourt and Dr. Fink. Pleasure launched the start of Ball¹s songwriting and production career.

Ball co-wrote and produced the single "Love on the Brain" for Rihanna's album Anti. "Love on the Brain" peaked at number 5 on the Billboard Hot 100. Billboard called it "The Most Influential Pop Single of 2017." It's been certified 5 times platinum in the US. In March 2017 Billboard listed Ball as number 8 in the "Hot 100 Top 10 Producers".

In June 2018, Ball contributed as a producer on three songs ("713", "Friends" and "Heard about us") for Jay-Z and Beyoncé's collaborative studio album "Everything Is Love".

Ball produced "Nice Guy feat. Jessie Reyez" on Eminem's album Kamikaze, surprise released 31 August 2018.
He also produced "One Mo' Gen" on Mariah Carey's critically acclaimed album "Caution".

Ball is published by Warner Chappell and managed by Roc Nation.

In March 2020, Ball launched his record label BALLROOM MUSIC as a joint venture with Roc Nation and released their first signing Harloe.

Production/writing discography 

Alicia Keys
 Dead End Road (Originals)
 Dead End Road (Unlocked)

Harloe
 Overthinking (Feat.Nile Rodgers)

Ray BLK
 Over You (Feat.Stefflon Don)

Olivia Dean
 Fall Again

Anne-Marie
 X2
 Breathing

Zara Larsson
 Last Summer

Sam Dew
 Thinking of You

Harry Hudson
 Closing Doors feat. Astrid S

Astrid S
 Marilyn Monroe

Jessie Reyez
 Do You Love Her

Harloe
 Rivers Run Dry
 One More Chance
 Cut Me Loose
 We're All Gonna Lose
 Crush On You

Mura Masa
 Vicarious Living Anthem

Adam Lambert
 Ready To Run
 Roses feat. Nile Rodgers

Au/Ra
 Stay Happy

Maeta
 babygirl

Raye
 Love Me Again

JC Stewart
 Have You Had Enough Wine?

Kevin Garrett
 Don't Rush

Roses Gabor
 Turkish Delight

Mariah Carey
 One Mo 'Gen

They.
 Wilt Chamberlain (feat. Jeremih)

Eminem
 Nice Guy feat. Jessie Reyez

Jessie Reyez
 Apple Juice

Beyonce & Jay-Z (The Carters)
 713
 Friends
 Heard About Us

Anne Marie
 Some People
Prince Charlez
 Back Around
Justine Skye
 Heaven
Madison Beer
 Say It To My Face
Frank Walker (ft. Emely Warren)
 Piano
Nina Nesbitt
 Take Me To Heaven
Rihanna
Love On The Brain

Toni Braxton
Deadwood
Sorry

Zara Larsson
One Mississippi

Jessie Ware
Slow Me Down

Petite Meller
America

Astrid S
Does She Know

All Saints
Summer Rain
Puppet On A String

Betsy
Time

Toby Randall
Misfits

Samuel Larsen
You Should Know

Leo Stannard
In My Blood

Pleasure
Don't Look The Other Way
From The Country To The City
All I Want- Stories- Memory
Sensitivity
You Got To Love Someone
Disco Doctor
The Visionary

Pleasure II
Alright All Nite
Out Of Love
Throw it All Away
Back to You
UpTown
Bite The Beat
Silk Dream
Eskimo Kiss
Finest Thing
NYCSC
Nightvision

Little Boots
Click
Ghost

Bernhoft
Choices
Control
C'mon Talk
Space In My Heart
Buzz Aldrin
Wind You Up
Freedom- One Way Track
I Believe In All The Things You Don't
We Have A Dream

Cerys Matthews
Caught In The Middle

KT Tunstall
Universe & U

Little Mix
Nowhere To Go
Boy
See Me Now
They Just Don't Know You

Daley
Smoking Gun

Sophie Ellis Bextor
Synchronised

JLS
Last Song
Innocence
Shy Of The Cool

Pixie Lott
Catching Snowflakes

Samsaya
Stereotype
Bombay Calling
Beginning at The End
Love Maze
Breaking Bad
Superhero
My Mind

Kylie Minogue
Uncut Stone

Brett Anderson
Love is Dead
To The Winter
Scorpio Rising
Colour Of The Night
Song For My Father
The More We Possess the less we own Ourselves
Chinese Whispers
Back To You

Bertine Zetlitz
Ah Ah
Fake Your Beauty
Want You
If YouBuy The Blue One
Kiss me Harder
Candy
Rollerskating
Broken

Emmanuelle Seigner
Les Mots Simples

Eminem
Kamikaze

Awards and honors 

Sunday Times – Album of the Year 
Grammy Nomination 2015: Best R&B Album for Bernhoft's Islander 
Grammy Nomination 2017: Best Urban Contemporary Album for Rihanna's "Anti"
Grammy Nomination 2019: Best R&B Album for Toni Braxton's "Sex & Cigarettes"
Grammy Win 2019: Best Urban Contemporary Album for The Carter's "Everything Is Love"
Grammy Nomination 2020: Best Urban Contemporary Album for Jessie Reyez' "Being Human In Public"
BMI R&B/Hip Hop Award 2017
BMI London Award 2017
BMI POP Awards LOS ANGELES 2018

References 

1977 births
Living people
Norwegian record producers
People from Fredrikstad
Norwegian emigrants to England